Serbia and Montenegro (SCG) competed at the 2005 Mediterranean Games in Almería, Spain. The nation had a total number of 153 participants (108 men and 45 women) in the sports meet.

Medals

Gold
 Athletics
Women's Discus Throw: Dragana Tomašević

 Karate
Women's – 60 kg: Snežana Perić

 Judo
Men's Half-Lightweight (– 66 kg): Miloš Mijalković

 Shooting
Women's Sport Pistol: Jasna Šekarić
Men's 50m Rifle (three positions): Stevan Pletikosić

 Table Tennis
Men's Doubles: Slobodan Grujić and Aleksandar Karakašević
Women's Doubles: Silvija Erdelji and Anamaria Erdelji

 Wrestling
Men's Greco-Roman (– 55 kg): Kristijan Fris

Silver
 Athletics
Women's 1.500 metres: Sonja Stolić

 Boxing
Men's Light Welterweight (– 64 kg): Milan Piperski

 Handball
Women's Team Competition: Marija Lojpur, Suzana Ćubela, Katarina Bulatović, Marijana Trbojević, Ana Vojčić, Marina Rokić, Jelena Erić, Svetlana Ognjenović, Jelena Nišavić, Ana Đokić, Jelena Popović, Mirjana Milenković, Ivana Milošević, Slađana Đerić, Dragica Kresoja, and Tatjana Medved.

 Karate
Men's – 80 kg: Miloš Živković
Men's + 80 kg: Almir Cecunjanin

 Rowing
Men's Single Sculls: Nikola Stojić

 Shooting
Men's Air Rifle (10 metres): Nemanja Mirosavljev
Men's small-bore Rifle (three positions): Nemanja Mirosavljev

 Wrestling
Men's Greco-Roman (– 60 kg): Davor Štefanek

Bronze
 Athletics
Women's 10.000 metres: Olivera Jevtić
Women's Half Marathon: Olivera Jevtić

 Boxing
Men's Bantamweight (– 54 kg): Andrija Bogdanović
Men's Middleweight (– 75 kg): Nikola Sjekloća
Men's Super Heavyweight (+ 91 kg): Milan Vasiljević

 Canoeing
Men's K-2 (500m): Ognjen Filipović and Dragan Zorić

 Judo
Men's Heavyweight (+ 100 kg): Obren Božović
Women's Middleweight (– 70 kg): Tamara Šešević

 Shooting
Women's Air Rifle (10 metres): Aranka Binder
Men's Air Pistol (10 metres): Damir Mikec

 Table Tennis
Men's Singles: Slobodan Grujić

 Volleyball
Men's Team Competition: Milan Vasić, Vlado Petković, Novica Bjelica, Bojan Janić, Nikola Rosić, Ivica Jevtić, Mladen Majdak, Branimir Perić, Nikola Kovačević, Aleksandar Spirovski, Dejan Radić, and Nemanja Dukić

 Water polo
Men's Team Competition: Damjan Danilović, Nikola Vukčević, Miloš Korolija, Nikola Rađen, Vojislav Vejzagić, Draško Brguljan, Marko Ćuk, Filip Filipović, Aleksandar Ivović, Andrija Prlainović, Branislav Mitrović, Mlađan Janović, and Miloš Šćepanović

 Wrestling
Men's Greco-Roman (– 96 kg): Radomir Petković

Medals by sport

See also
 Serbia and Montenegro at the 2004 Summer Olympics
 Serbia at the 2008 Summer Olympics
 Montenegro at the 2008 Summer Olympics

References
 Official Site
 Serbian Olympic Committee

Nations at the 2005 Mediterranean Games
2005
Mediterranean Games